Becoming a Billionaire (lit. "Birth of the Rich") is a 2010 South Korean television series starring Ji Hyun-woo, Lee Bo-young, Lee Si-young and Namkoong Min. It aired on KBS2 from March 1 to May 4, 2010 on Mondays and Tuesdays at 21:55 for 20 episodes.

Plot
Choi Seok-bong believes he is the son of a billionaire, from a one-night stand with his mother.  While working as a bellboy at a luxury hotel, Seok-bong practices the qualities he thinks a billionaire's heir would have; all these efforts are for the day he meets his birth father. But one day, Seok-bong is diagnosed with breast cancer, which only has a 50 percent survival rate. Seok-bong doesn't have enough money for treatments, and finds it absolutely ridiculous that a billionaire's heir would die because he has no money. Finding his biological father may be Seok-bong's only hope. So he turns for help to Lee Shin-mi, the heiress of Ohsung Group and a notorious penny-pincher.

Cast

Main characters 
 Ji Hyun-woo as Choi Seok-bong
 Park Gun-woo as teenage Choi Seok-bong
 A bell boy at Ohsung Hotel in first few episodes.
 Lee Bo-young as Lee Shin-mi
 Kim So-hyun as young Lee Shin-mi
 The heiress of Ohsung Group, and a strict and frugal person. Ohsung Hotel director in first few episodes.
 Namkoong Min as Chu Woon-seok
 An ambitious man whose goal is to revive his father's company, Frontier Group and is interested in Shin-mi. But coming to the end of the drama, he silently declared his love for Tae-hee when she visited him in prison.
 Lee Si-young as Bu Tae-hee
 A spoiled heiress of Buho Group and is interested in Woon-seok. / Bu Tae-hee's mother (ep. 11, cameo)

Supporting characters 
The CEO's
 Yoon Joo-sang as Lee Jung-hyun
 CEO of Ohsung Group, father of Shin-mi
 Kim Eung-soo as Bu Gwi-ho
 CEO of Buho Group, father of Tae-hee
 Park Young-ji as Chu Young-dal
 CEO of Frontier Group, father of Woon-seok

Extended cast
 Shin Da-eun as Han So-jung
 Shin-mi's secretary
 Kim Dong-gyun as Mr. Yoo
 Employee of Ohsung, working as spy for Woon-seok
 Jung Joo-eun as Yoon Mal-ja
 Tae-hee's secretary
 Kim Ki-bang as Park Kang-woo
 Seok-bong's best friend 
 Park Min-ji as Park Kang-sook
 Kang-woo's sister 
 Ok Ji-young as Bang Soo-jin
 Weekly magazine reporter
 Sung Ji-ru as Woo Byung-doo
 A homeless wanderer with an interest in molybdenum, Seok-bong's irksome acquaintance, uninvited roommate, and later, business partner
 Jang Yoo-joon as Woo Bung-eo
 Byung-doo's son who is musically talented
 Kim Mi-kyung as Kang-woo's mother
 Jung Han-yong as Kang-woo's father
 Min Wook as Ha Joon-tae
 Son Ho-young as young adult Ha Joon-tae
 The ailing owner of the licence to the mining rights of a molybdenum mine
 Park Chul-min as Kim Dal-soo
 Hotel captain at Ohsung Hotel, later Lee Jung-hyun's butler

Cameos
 Son Ho-young as Seok-bong's father
 Lee Won-jong as Seok-bong's middle school math teacher
 Choi Song-hyun as Seok-bong's mother when she met Ha Joon-tae
 Jang Tae-sung as Ohsung Hotel bellman
 Lee Han-wi as Teriah Park

Ratings

International broadcast
It also aired on Fuji TV as part of the network's "Hallyu Alpha Summer Festival," and on cable channel KNTV beginning July 2, 2014.

It aired on Thailand on Workpoint TV from March 10, 2014 to April 4, 2014.

References

External links
  
 
 

Korean Broadcasting System television dramas
Korean-language television shows
2010 South Korean television series endings
2010 South Korean television series debuts
South Korean romantic comedy television series